Hubert is a given name and a surname.

Hubert may also refer to:

Locations
 Hubert, Kentucky
 Hubert, North Carolina

Other uses 
 "Hubert", an episode of The Good Doctor

See also
 Saint-Hubert (disambiguation)
 Hubert-Folie, France